Dacoity is a term used for "banditry" in the Indian subcontinent. The spelling is the anglicised version of the Hindi word डाकू (daaku); "dacoit"  is a colloquial Indian English word with this meaning and it appears in the Glossary of Colloquial Anglo-Indian Words and Phrases (1903). Banditry is criminal activity involving robbery by groups of armed bandits. The East India Company established the Thuggee and Dacoity Department in 1830, and the Thuggee and Dacoity Suppression Acts, 1836–1848 were enacted in British India under East India Company rule.  Areas with ravines or forests, such as Chambal and Chilapata Forests, were once known for dacoits.

Etymology
The word "dacoity", the anglicized version of the Hindi word ḍakaitī (historically spelled dakaitee). Hindi डकैती comes from ḍākū (historically spelled dakoo, Hindi: डाकू, meaning "armed robber").

The term dacoit (Hindi: डकैत ḍakait) means "a bandit" according to the OED ("A member of a class of robbers in India and Burma, who plunder in armed bands").

History

Bandits of Bhind-Morena and Chambal 
The dacoity have had a large impact in the Bhind and Morena of Chambal regions in Madhya Pradesh, Rajasthan, Haryana and Uttar Pradesh in north-central India. The exact reasons for the emergence of dacoity in the Chambal valley have been disputed. Most explanations have simply suggested feudal exploitation as the cause that provoked many people of this region to take to arms. The area was also underdeveloped and poor, so that banditry posed great economic incentives. However, the fact that many gangs operating in this valley were composed of higher castes and wealthy people appears to suggest that feudalism may only be a partial explanation of dacoity in Chambal valley (Bhaduri, 1972; Khan, 1981; Jatar, 1980; Katare, 1972). Furthermore, traditional honour codes and blood feuds would drive some into criminality.

In Chambal, India, organized crime controlled much of the countryside from the time of the British Raj up to the early 2000s, with the police offering high rewards for the most notorious bandit chiefs. The criminals regularly targeted local businesses, though they preferred to kidnap wealthy people, and demand ransom from their relatives - cutting off fingers, noses, and ears to pressure them into paying high sums. Many dacoity also posed as social bandits toward the local poor, paying medical bills and funding weddings. One ex-dacoit described his own criminal past by claiming that "I was a rebel. I fought injustice." Following intense anti-banditry campaigns by the Indian Police, highway robbery was almost completely eradicated in the early 2000s. Nevertheless, Chambal is still popularly believed to be unsafe and bandit-infested by many Indians. One police officer noted that the fading of the dacoity was also due to social changes, as few young people were any longer willing to endure the harsh life as a highway robber in the countryside. Instead, they prefer to join crime groups in the city, where life is easier.

Other dacoity 
The term is also applied, according to the OED, to "pirates who formerly infested the Ganges between Calcutta and Burhampore".

Dacoits existed in Burma as well – Rudyard Kipling's fictional Private Mulvaney hunted Burmese dacoits in "The Taking of Lungtungpen". Sax Rohmer's criminal mastermind Dr. Fu Manchu also employed Burmese dacoits as his henchmen.

Indian police forces use "Known Dacoit" (K.D.) as a label to classify criminals.

Notable dacoits

Notable dacoits include:
 Chavviram Singh Yadav
 Gabbar Singh Gujjar - inspired the famous 1975 film Sholay, based on his life
 Man Singh was a notorious Dacoit of the Rathore clan of Rajputs. He was also known as the Lion of Chambal.
 Malkhan Singh Rajpoot, a notorious bandit known as the Bandit King or King of Dacoits. He also had political aspirations in MP.
 Malangi
 Kallu Yadav (Kalua), also known as Katri King
 Mohar Singh
 Nirbhay Singh Gujjar
 Nizam Lohar, a dacoit born into a Punjabi Muslim family during the Sikh Empire. He is known for his rebellion and freedom struggle against the East India Company.
 Paan Singh Tomar, a former soldier in the Indian Army, an athlete that represented India in the Asian Games, who later resorted to becoming a Baaghi due to the injustices he faced. Also inspired the famous Bollywood film Paan Singh Tomar played by Irrfan Khan.
 Phoolan Devi
 Rambabu Gadariya - Regarded as the last notorious dacoit of Chambal
 Shiv Kumar Patel (Dadua)
 Ramashish Koeri was active in Rohtas Plateau of Bihar in 1980s. He was the leader of a group of bandits, who were supported by the people from lower strata of society. This dacoit group was known for challenging the hagemony of upper caste landlords in the region, who were exploitative.
 Jagga Jatt
 Veerappan, a notorious dacoit, poacher, and smuggler in South India.

Protection measures
In Madhya Pradesh, women belonging to a village defence group have been issued firearm permits to fend off dacoity. The Chief minister of the state, Shivraj Singh Chouhan, recognised the role the women had played in defending their villages without guns. He stated that he wanted to enable these women to better defend both themselves and their villages, and issued the gun permits to advance this goal.

In popular culture

Dacoit films
As the dacoits flourished through the 1940s–1970s, they were the subject of various Hindi films made during this era, leading to the emergence of the dacoit film genre in Hindi Film Industry. The genre began with Mehboob Khan's Aurat (1940), which he remade as Mother India (1957). Mother India received an Academy Award nomination, and defined the dacoit film genre, along with Dilip Kumar's Gunga Jumna (1961). Other popular films in this genre included Raj Kapoor’s Jis Desh Mein Ganga Behti Hai (1961) and Moni Bhattacharjee's Mujhe Jeene Do (1963).

Pakistani actor Akmal Khan had two dacoit films, Malangi (1965) and Imam Din Gohavia (1967). Other films in this genre included Khote Sikkay (1973), Mera Gaon Mera Desh (1971), and Kuchhe Dhaage (1973) both by Raj Khosla.

The most famous dacoit film is Sholay (1975), written by Salim–Javed, and starring Dharmendra, Amitabh Bachchan, and Amjad Khan as the dacoit character Gabbar Singh. It was a masala film that combined the dacoit film conventions of Mother India and Gunga Jumna with that of Spaghetti Westerns, spawning the "Dacoit Western" genre, also known as the "Curry Western" genre. The film also borrowed elements from Akira Kurosawa's Seven Samurai. Sholay became a classic in the genre, and its success led to a surge of films in this genre, including Ganga Ki Saugandh (1978), once again starring Amitabh Bachchan and Amjad Khan.

An internationally acclaimed example of the genre is Bandit Queen (1994).

The Tamil movie starring Karthi, Theeran Adhigaaram Ondru (2017) deals elaborately with bandits. The film reveals the real dacoity incidents which held in Tamil Nadu between 1995 and 2005. Director Vinoth did a two-year research about bandits to develop the script.

A related genre of crime films are Mumbai underworld films.

Other media
Bengali novel Devi Chowdhurani by author Bankim Chandra Chatterjee in 1867.

A Hindi novel named Painstth Lakh ki Dacoity (1977) was written by Surender Mohan Pathak; it was translated as The 65 Lakh Heist.

Dacoits armed with pistols and swords appear in Age of Empires III: Asian Dynasties.

They frequently appeared in the French language Bob Morane series of novels by Henri Vernes, principally as the main thugs or assassins of the hero's recurring villain, Mr. Ming and in English as the agents of Sax Rohmer’s Fu Manchu.

See also 
Meenas
Organised crime in India
Criminal Tribes Act

References

Further reading
Phoolan Devi, with Marie-Therese Cuny, and Paul Rambali, The Bandit Queen of India: An Indian Woman's Amazing Journey from Peasant to International Legend Guilford, CT: The Lyons Press, 2006 
Mala Sen, India's Bandit Queen: The true Story of Phoolan Devi, HarperCollins Publishers (September 1991) .
G. K. Betham, The Story of a Dacoity, and the Lolapaur Week: An Up-Country Sketch. BiblioBazaar, 2008. .
Shyam Sunder Katare, Patterns of dacoity in India: a case study of Madhya Pradesh. S. Chand, 1972.
Mohammad Zahir Khan, Dacoity in Chambal Valley. National, 1981.

External links

Dacoity - Indian Penal Code, Chapter XVII (Mobile Friendly)
As modern world closes in, India's fabled bandits are disappearing - International Herald Tribune

British India
Banditry
Outlaws
Illegal occupations
Organised crime in Pakistan
Indian robbers
Gangs in India
Indian slang
Pakistani slang
Bengali words and phrases
Urdu-language words and phrases
Organised crime in India
Secret societies in India
Secret societies related to organized crime

hi:डकैती